The Marrett River language, also known as Urratjingu, is an extinct Australian language of the Queensland coast. It remains unclassified, but is known to have been quite distinct from Flinders Island language to the east and from the various languages spoken by the Lama-Lama to its west.

References

Paman languages
Extinct languages of Queensland
Unclassified languages of Australia
Indigenous Australian languages in Queensland